Welcome Oblivion is the debut studio album by American post-industrial group How to Destroy Angels. It was released on March 5, 2013 on Columbia Records. It was described as "sensual electronic rock" by the Los Angeles Times.

Promotion
The release date for the album was announced on January 10, 2013, via the band's official blog. The album cover for the vinyl edition and the track list was announced on January 31, 2013. The iTunes version of the album included the six tracks that made up the band's first EP, How to Destroy Angels, as bonus tracks.

The music video for "How Long?", directed by London-based art collective Shynola, was released on January 31, 2013.

The album was posted for streaming in its entirety on Pitchfork on February 19, 2013.

Formats
The album was released on both CD and vinyl editions, with different artworks for each. The vinyl version also contained two extra tracks, "The Province of Fear" and "Unintended Consequences", as well as a slightly different running order. These songs were also included on a white label CD that accompanied the vinyl copy.

Track listing

Personnel
The album personnel, as adapted from the liner notes:
Written, arranged, produced, programmed, performed and packaged byHow to Destroy Angels
Mariqueen Maandig
Trent Reznor
Atticus Ross
Rob Sheridan

Other personnel
Alessandro Cortini – co-writing and performance on "We Fade Away"
Alan Moulder – mixing
Tom Baker – mastering
Blumpy – recording
Dustin Mosley – additional engineering
Jun Murakawa – additional engineering

References

2013 debut albums
Columbia Records albums
The Null Corporation albums
How to Destroy Angels (band) albums